Ronnachai Rangsiyo (born August 1, 1988), or simply known as Sam, is a Thai professional footballer who plays as a forward. He scored a goal for the Thai National Team in a friendly match against Nepal.

International career

Ronnachai made his international debut against Nepal and scored, he has recently been named in the squad that will take part in the 2008 T&T Cup held in Vietnam.

International

International goals

Honours

Clubs
PEA
 Thai Premier League (1): 2008

Muangthong United
 Thai Premier League (1): 2009

 Lamphun Warriors
 Thai League 2 (1): 2021–22

International
Thailand
 VFF Cup (1): 2008

References

External links

1988 births
Living people
Ronnachai Rangsiyo
Ronnachai Rangsiyo
Association football forwards
Ronnachai Rangsiyo
Ronnachai Rangsiyo
Ronnachai Rangsiyo
Ronnachai Rangsiyo
Ronnachai Rangsiyo
Ronnachai Rangsiyo
Ronnachai Rangsiyo
Ronnachai Rangsiyo
Ronnachai Rangsiyo
Ronnachai Rangsiyo
Ronnachai Rangsiyo
Footballers at the 2010 Asian Games
Ronnachai Rangsiyo
Ronnachai Rangsiyo
Ronnachai Rangsiyo
Expatriate footballers in England